Makenzie Jade Vega Norfolk (born February 10, 1994), known professionally as Makenzie Vega, is an American actress. She is known for her role as Grace Florrick on The Good Wife and as the 11-year-old counterpart of Nancy Callahan in Sin City.

Life and career
Vega was born in Los Angeles, California. Her father, Baruch Vega, is a Colombian fashion photographer who was an informant for the Drug Enforcement Administration,De Cordoba, Jose, "Fashion Photographer Scored Millions As an Informant, but Was Justice Served?", The Wall Street Journal, December 7, 2000 and her mother, Gina Rue, is an American former model. She is the younger sister of actress Alexa Vega.

At the age of five, Vega played one of the children of Teddie Cochran (Geena Davis) in The Geena Davis Show. In 2000, she was cast as Annie, the Campbells' precocious daughter in The Family Man. The following year, Vega was seen again playing Chloe in Made which starred Vince Vaughn, Jon Favreau and Famke Janssen. In 2004, she played Diana Gordon, daughter of Dr. Lawrence Gordon (Cary Elwes) and Alison Gordon (Monica Potter) in the horror film Saw. Her next movie was Sin City, in which she played young Nancy Callahan, alongside Bruce Willis. Vega then appeared in Just My Luck as Katy, starring Lindsay Lohan and Chris Pine, and also in the summer blockbuster X-Men: The Last Stand as the Prison Truck Little Girl, which was one of the forms that the shapeshifter Mystique took in the film.

Vega played Grace Florrick, the daughter of Alicia Florrick (Julianna Margulies), in the CBS drama The Good Wife; she was a regular cast member through six of the show's seven seasons, and was recurring cast member in the seventh and final season, with Grace providing critical plot elements to the series' finale.  In 2015, Vega was cast in the lead role in the thriller film Fender Bender, which premiered on the Chiller channel in June 2016.

Personal life
Vega married Australian model Blair Norfolk on February 4, 2017, in a secret wedding which the couple announced publicly three weeks after.

Filmography

References

External links
 

1994 births
Living people
20th-century American actresses
21st-century American actresses
American child actresses
American film actresses
American television actresses
Hispanic and Latino American actresses
Actresses from Los Angeles
American people of Colombian descent